Leo Massa (October 15, 1929 – September 3, 2009) was an American cross-country skier. He competed in the men's 30 kilometre event at the 1960 Winter Olympics.

Raised in Red Bank, New Jersey, Massa played baseball at Red Bank Regional High School well enough to earn a Major League Baseball tryout, before switching over to focus cross-country skiing, a sport he learned in Finland during his pre-teen years.

References

1929 births
2009 deaths
American male cross-country skiers
Olympic cross-country skiers of the United States
Cross-country skiers at the 1960 Winter Olympics
Sportspeople from Clearwater, Florida
People from Red Bank, New Jersey
Red Bank Regional High School alumni
Sportspeople from Monmouth County, New Jersey